Benton College of Law was a law school in St. Louis, Missouri. George L. Corlis was its dean. James Avery Webb helped establish the school.

The school initially only offered night classes. In 1899, an act of the Missouri legislature allowed graduates to be admitted to the Missouri bar without taking the bar exam. By 1921, the college was offering both day and night classes. It closed in 1937.

Several documents related to the college are extant including copies of addresses given to graduating classes. Henry S. Priest spoke to the graduating class in 1914.

Alumni
Myles P. Dyer
W. J. Doran
Aloys P. Kaufmann
Richard Ralph (politician)
John Keating Regan
Marion Charles Matthes
Amabel Anderson Arnold
Jacob Edwin Meeker
Thomas C. Hennings Jr.
William McChesney Martin

References

Schools in Missouri